Over the last 40 years the Indian state of  Himachal Pradesh has witnessed much improvement in public health facilities.

Hospitals
In 1989, there were around 899 public health institutions, including state hospital, twelve district hospitals, 189 primary health centres, besides mainstream "Western" and ayurvedic dispensaries and specialized medical institutions. In order to meet the shortage of doctors, a medical college was established in 1967, which is having post-graduate teaching facilities in some branches.
Death rate has now come down by 70% due to numerous public health measures. The incidence of venereal disease, which was roughly about 17% in 1951, has now came down to 2% in 1989. Diseases like malaria and small pox has been eradicated. The Tuberculosis control programme has been a great success. People have taken a keen interest in the family planning programme. One of its interesting feature is that women have outnumbered men in its acceptance.

Education

In 1948 the state had only 200 educational institutions, out of which most of them were primary schools. In 1989 the state had 9,112 educational institutions including 38 colleges, 932 high secondary and high schools, 1,068 middle schools and 7,074 primary schools. The enrollment in these institutions was nearly 1,122,000 or about 26% of the entire state.  The literacy percentage which was just 6.7% in 1951 and 31.32% in 1971, raised to 42.48% in 1989 and in 1991 it further reached to 63.54%. Himachal got its first university in 1971. Then 2 more universities, one for agriculture and the other for horticulture and forestry were established at Palampur and Solan, respectively.

Water supply
Drinking water supply poses a major problem in the state. Because of high altitude terrain and undulating topography drinking water is mainly obtained from streams. The pollution, lack of sanitation and open air defecation, leads to contamination of surface water. Water pollutants create a wide variety of problems by entering into the food chain. Over-exploitation of natural resources and dumping of hazardous wastes further aggravates the problem. Being unhygienic, it results to pollution and can spread diseases like hill dysentery. Since villages are sparsely populated and distantly located, the arrangement of drinking water leads to the problem of high costs. 
In 1948, except 4 towns, no other habitation in the state had piped water supply. By 1989, drinking water through pipes was made available in about 15,000 villages covering about 75% of the state population. Now alternate sources -underground water has been tapped through handpumps. Under ARWSP, the following norms are being adopted for providing drinking water to rural population in the habitations : 
40 litres per capita per day of safe drinking water for human beings. 
30 litres per capita per day additional for cattle in the desert development programme areas.
One hand pump or stand post for every 250 persons. 
The water source should exist within 1.6 km in the plains and within 100 metres elevation in the hilly areas. 
[Water is defined as safe if it is free from biological contamination (cholera, typhoid, etc.) and chemical contamination (excess arsenic, fluoride, salinity, iron, nitrates, etc.)] 
Habitations which have a safe drinking water source point (either private or public) within 1.6 km in plains and 100 metre in hill areas but the capacity of the system ranges between 10 lpcd to 40 lpcd, are categorized as partially covered and those having less than 10 litres per capita per day are categorized as not covered.

All the 16807 census villages have been provided with drinking water facilities. An ambitious project, under the Bharat Nirman Yojna, more than 40107 habitations are fully covered March 2006 and remaining 5260 partially covered habitations to be provided drinking water facility by March 2007.

References
http://ddws.gov.in/habquery/main_menu.asp
http://mohfw.nic.in/NRHM/State%20Files/hp.htm#hp

See also 

Economy of Himachal Pradesh